, the World Checklist of Selected Plant Families accepted over 520 species in the genus Hoya.

A
Hoya acanthominima Kloppenb. – Philippines
Hoya acicularis T.Green & Kloppenb. – Borneo (Sabah, Brunei)
Hoya acuminata (Wight) Benth. ex Hook.f. – E. Himalaya to Myanmar
Hoya aeschynanthoides Schltr. – Borneo
Hoya affinis Hemsl. – Solomon Islands
Hoya agusanensis Kloppenb. – Philippines
Hoya alagensis Kloppenb. – Philippines
Hoya albida Kloppenb. – Philippines
Hoya albiflora (Blume) Zipp. ex K.Schum. – Papua New Guinea
Hoya aldrichii Hemsl. – Christmas Island
Hoya alexicaca (Jacq.) Moon – E. & S. India to Myanmar
Hoya alwitriana Kloppenb. – Philippines
Hoya amboinensis Warb. – Maluku (Ambon)
Hoya ambrosiae Kloppenb. – Philippines
Hoya amorosoae T.Green & Kloppenb. – Philippines
Hoya amrita Kloppenb. – Philippines (Mindanao)
Hoya andalensis Kloppenb. – Sumatera
Hoya annaleesoligamiae Kloppenb. – Philippines
Hoya anncajanoae Kloppenb. & Siar – Philippines (Luzon)
Hoya antilaoensis Kloppenb. – Philippines
Hoya anulata Schltr. – New Guinea to N. Queensland
Hoya aphylla Aver. – Laos
Hoya apoda S.Moore – New Guinea
Hoya apoensis Kloppenb. & Siar – Philippines
Hoya archboldiana C.Norman – New Guinea (incl. Kep. Aru)
Hoya arnottiana Wight – C. Himalaya to Indo-China
Hoya artwhistleri Kloppenb. – Samoa (Upolu)
Hoya attenuata Christoph. – Samoa
Hoya aurantiaca Kloppenb. – Philippines
Hoya aurigueana Kloppenb. – Philippines
Hoya australis R.Br. ex J.Traill – N. Borneo, New Guinea to SW. Pacific

B
Hoya bacunganensis Kloppenb. – Philippines
Hoya baguioensis Kloppenb. – Philippines
Hoya baishaensis S.Y.He & P.T.Li – SE. China to Hainan
Hoya bakoensis Rodda – Borneo (Sarawak)
Hoya balaensis Kidyoo & Thaithong – Thailand
Hoya bandaensis Schltr. – Maluku
Hoya bandongii Kloppenb. & Ferreras – Philippines
Hoya barbonii Kloppenb. – Philippines
Hoya bebsguevarrae Kloppenb. & Carandang – Philippines
Hoya beccarii Rodda & Simonsson – W. Malesia
Hoya bella Hook. – Assam (Manipur) to Myanmar
Hoya benchaii Gavrus – Borneo (Sabah)
Hoya benguetensis Schltr. – Philippines (Luzon)
Hoya benitotanii Kloppenb. – Philippines
Hoya benstoneana Kloppenb. – Philippines
Hoya benvergarae Kloppenb. & Siar – Philippines
Hoya betchei (Schltr.) W.A.Whistler – Samoa
Hoya bhutanica Grierson & D.G.Long – S. Bhutan
Hoya bicknellii Kloppenb. – Philippines
Hoya bicolensis Kloppenb. – Philippines
Hoya bicolor Kloppenb. – Philippines
Hoya bifunda Kloppenb. – Philippines
Hoya bilobata Schltr. – Philippines
Hoya blashernaezii Kloppenb. (includes Hoya valmayoriana) – Philippines
Hoya bonii Costantin – Vietnam
Hoya bordenii Schltr. – Philippines
Hoya borneoensis Kloppenb. – Borneo (Sarawak)
Hoya brassii P.I.Forst. & Liddle ex Simonsson & Rodda – W. New Guinea
Hoya brevialata Kleijn & Donkelaar – Sulawesi
Hoya brittonii Kloppenb. – Philippines
Hoya brooksii Ridl. – Sumatera
Hoya bunuabgensis Kloppenb. – Philippines (Luzon)
Hoya buotii Kloppenb. – Philippines
Hoya burmanica Rolfe – SE. Assam to N. Indo-China
Hoya burtoniae Kloppenb. – Philippines (Luzon)
Hoya buruensis Miq. – Maluku (Buru)
Hoya butleriana Kloppenb. – Philippines

C
Hoya cagayanensis C.M.Burton – Philippines (Luzon)
Hoya callistophylla T.Green – Borneo
Hoya calycina Schltr. – New Guinea to Bismarck Arch
Hoya calyxminuta Kloppenb. – Philippines
Hoya campanulata Blume – W. Malesia
Hoya camphorifolia Warb. – Philippines
Hoya capotoanensis Kloppenb. – Philippines
Hoya carandangiana Kloppenb. & Siar – Philippines
Hoya cardiophylla Merr. – Philippines
Hoya carmelae Kloppenb. – Philippines
Hoya carnosa (L.f.) R.Br. – S. China to Laos, Japan (S. Kyushu) to Taiwan
Hoya carrii P.I.Forst. & Liddle ex Simonsson & Rodda – Papua New Guinea
Hoya caudata Hook.f. – S. Thailand to W. Malesia
Hoya celata Kloppenb. – Philippines
Hoya celsa Kloppenb. – Philippines
Hoya cembra Kloppenb. – Philippines
Hoya chewiorum A.L.Lamb – Borneo (Sabah)
Hoya chiekoae Kloppenb. – Philippines
Hoya chinghungensis (Y.Tsiang & P.T.Li) M.G.Gilbert – China (S. Yunnan) to Indo-China
Hoya chlorantha Rech. – Samoa
Hoya chloroleuca Schltr. – New Guinea
Hoya chunii P.T.Li – New Guinea
Hoya ciliata Elmer ex C.M.Burton – Philippines
Hoya cinnamomifolia Hook. – Jawa
Hoya clemensiorum T.Green – Borneo
Hoya collettii Schltr. – Myanmar
Hoya collina Schltr. – New Guinea
Hoya columna Kloppenb. – Philippines
Hoya cominsii Hemsl. – Solomon Islandslands
Hoya commutata M.G.Gilbert & P.T.Li – China (Guangxi) to Myanmar
Hoya concava Kloppenb. – Philippines
Hoya corazoniae Kloppenb. – Philippines
Hoya cordata P.T.Li & S.Z.Huang – China (Guangxi)
Hoya coriacea Blume – Thailand to Malesia
Hoya corneri Rodda & S.Rahayu – Thailand to Pen. Malaysia, Borneo
Hoya corollimarginata Kloppenb. – Samoa
Hoya corollivillosa Kloppenb. – Philippines (Luzon)
Hoya coronaria Blume – Thailand to W. & C. Malesia
Hoya crassicaulis Elmer ex Kloppenb. – Philippines
Hoya crassior Hochr. – Samoa
Hoya crassipetiolata Aver. – Vietnam
Hoya cumingiana Decne. – Borneo, Jawa, Philippines
Hoya cupula Kloppenb. – Philippines
Hoya curtisii King & Gamble – Thailand to Pen. Malaysia, Borneo, Philippines
Hoya cutis-porcelana W.Suarez – Philippines

D
Hoya daimenglongensis Shao Y.He & P.T.Li – China (Yunnan)
Hoya danumensis Rodda & Nyhuus – Sumatera, Borneo
Hoya dasyantha Tsiang – Hainan
Hoya davidcummingii Kloppenb. – Philippines (S. Luzon)
Hoya decipulae S.Rahayu & Astuti – Sumatera
Hoya deleoniorum Cabactulan – Philippines
Hoya dennisii P.I.Forst. & Liddle – Solomon Islands
Hoya densifolia Turcz. – Jawa, Philippines
Hoya desvoeuxensis T.Green & Kloppenb. – Fiji
Hoya devogelii Rodda & Simonsson – Borneo (Sarawak)
Hoya deykei T.Green – Sumatera
Hoya dickasoniana P.T.Li – Myanmar
Hoya dictyoneura K.Schum. – New Guinea
Hoya dimorpha F.M.Bailey – New Guinea
Hoya diptera Seem. – Vanuatu, Fiji
Hoya dischorensis Schltr. – New Guinea
Hoya diversifolia Blume – Hainan, Indo-China to Malesia
Hoya dolichosparte Schltr. – Sulawesi

E
Hoya eburnea Kloppenb. – Philippines
Hoya edanoi C.M.Burton – Philippines
Hoya edeni King ex Hook.f. – Nepal to Assam
Hoya edholmiana Simonsson & Rodda – Papua New Guinea
Hoya eitapensis Schltr. – NE. New Guinea
Hoya elegans Kostel. – Maluku
Hoya elliptica Hook.f. – Thailand to W. Malesia
Hoya elmeri Merr. – Borneo (Sabah), Philippines (Luzon)
Hoya endauensis Kiew – Pen. Malaysia (Johore)
Hoya engleriana Hosseus – Indo-China
Hoya epedunculata Schltr. – New Guinea
Hoya erythrina Rintz – Vietnam, Pen. Malaysia
Hoya erythrostemma Kerr – Indo-China
Hoya espaldoniana Kloppenb. – Philippines
Hoya estrellaensis T.Green & Kloppenb. – Philippines
Hoya eumbeitii Kloppenb. – Philippines
Hoya evelinae Simonsson & Rodda – Papua New Guinea
Hoya excavata Teijsm. & Binn. – Sulawesi to Maluku
Hoya exilis Schltr. – New Guinea

F
Hoya faoensis Kloppenb. & Siar – Samoa
Hoya fauziana Rodda – Borneo (Sabah)
Hoya ferrerasii Kloppenb. & Siar – Philippines
Hoya fetuana Kloppenb. – Samoa
Hoya filiformis Rech. – Samoa
Hoya finlaysonii Wight – S. Thailand to W. Malesia
Hoya fischeriana Warb. – Philippines
Hoya fitchii Kloppenb. – Philippines
Hoya fitoensis Kloppenb. – Samoa
Hoya flavescens Schltr. – New Guinea
Hoya flavida P.I.Forst. & Liddle – Solomon Islands
Hoya forbesii King & Gamble – W. Malesia
Hoya foxii Kloppenb. – Philippines
Hoya frakeii Kloppenb. – Philippines
Hoya fraterna Blume – Borneo (Sabah), Jawa
Hoya fungii Merr. – China (Yunnan to Guangdong) to Indo-China
Hoya fusca Wall. – Himalaya to S. China and Indo-China

G
Hoya galenii Kloppenb. – Philippines
Hoya galeraensis Kloppenb. – Philippines
Hoya gaoligongensis M.X.Zhao & Y.H.Tan
Hoya garciae Kloppenb. – Philippines
Hoya gelba Kloppenb. – Philippines
Hoya gigantanganensis Kloppenb. – Philippines (Leyte)
Hoya gigas Schltr. – New Guinea
Hoya gildingii Kloppenb. – Borneo (Sabah)
Hoya glabra Schltr. – Sumatera, N. & NW. Borneo
Hoya globulifera Blume – New Guinea
Hoya globulosa Hook.f. – Himalaya to China (Yunnan to Guangdong) and Indo-China
Hoya golamcoana Kloppenb. – Philippines (Palawan)
Hoya gracilipes Schltr. – New Guinea
Hoya gracilis Schltr. – Sulawesi
Hoya greenii Kloppenb. – Philippines (Mindanao)
Hoya gretheri Kloppenb. – Philippines
Hoya griffithii Hook.f. – Assam to Hainan
Hoya guppyi Oliv. – Solomon Islands
Hoya gutierrezii Kloppenb. – Philippines

H
Hoya hainanensis Merr. – Hainan, Vietnam
Hoya halconensis Kloppenb. – Philippines
Hoya halophila Schltr. – NE. New Guinea to Solomon Islands
Hoya hamiltoniorum A.L.Lamb – N. Borneo (C. & S. Crocker Range)
Hoya hanhiae V.T.Pham & Aver. – Vietnam
Hoya hernaezii Kloppenb. – Philippines
Hoya heuschkeliana Kloppenb. – Philippines
Hoya histora Kloppenb. – Philippines
Hoya hypolasia Schltr. – Papua New Guinea

I
Hoya ignorata T.B.Tran – Indo-China to Pen. Malaysia, Borneo
Hoya ilagiorum Kloppenb. – Philippines
Hoya imbricata Decne. – Philippines to Sulawesi
Hoya imperialis Lindl. – Pen. Thailand to W. & C. Malesia
Hoya inconspicua Hemsl. – New Guinea to Vanuatu
Hoya incrassata Warb. – Philippines
Hoya incurvula Schltr. – Sulawesi
Hoya indaysarae M.N.Medina – Philippines (Dinagat)
Hoya infantalensis Kloppenb. – Philippines
Hoya inflata (P.I.Forst. – Papua New Guinea
Hoya insularis Rodda & S.Rahayu – Borneo
Hoya irisiae Ferreras – Philippines
Hoya isabelaensis Kloppenb. – Philippines
Hoya isabelchanae Rodda & Simonsson – Sulawesi
Hoya ischnopus Schltr. – New Guinea

J–K
Hoya jianfenglingensis Shao Y.He & P.T.Li – Hainan
Hoya jiewhoeana Rodda – Borneo (Sabah)
Hoya josetteae M.N.Medina & Kloppenb. – Philippines
Hoya juannguoana Kloppenb. – Philippines
Hoya juhoneweana Simonsson & Rodda – Papua New Guinea
Hoya kanlaonensis Kloppenb. – Philippines
Hoya kanyakumariana A.N.Henry & Swamin. – India (Tamil Nadu)
Hoya kastbergii Kloppenb. – Borneo (Sarawak), Sulawesi
Hoya kenejiana Schltr. – New Guinea
Hoya kentiana C.M.Burton – Philippines (Luzon)
Hoya kerrii Craib – Indo-China to W. Malesia. (36) ch
Hoya kingdonwardii P.T.Li – Myanmar
Hoya kipandiensis Gavrus – Borneo (Sabah)
Hoya kloppenburgii T.Green – Borneo (Sabah, Brunei)
Hoya klossii S.Moore – New Guinea
Hoya koteka Simonsson & Rodda – W. New Guinea
Hoya krohniana Kloppenb. & Siar – Philippines
Hoya krusenstierniana Simonsson & Rodda – Papua New Guinea
Hoya kuhlii (Blume) Koord. – W. Jawa

L
Hoya lactea S.Moore – New Guinea
Hoya lacunosa Blume – Thailand to W. & C. Malesia. (36) ch
Hoya lagunaensis Kloppenb. – Philippines
Hoya lambii T.Green – Borneo (Sabah)
Hoya lambioae Kloppenb. – Philippines
Hoya lamingtoniae F.M.Bailey – New Guinea
Hoya lanataiensis Kloppenb. – Samoa (Upolu)
Hoya lanceolaria S.Moore – New Guinea
Hoya lanceolata Wall. ex D.Don – Himalaya to Indo-China
Hoya landgrantensis Kloppenb. – Philippines
Hoya lanotooensis Kloppenb. – Samoa
Hoya larrycahilogii Medina & Kloppenb. – Philippines
Hoya lasiantha Korth. ex Blume – Thailand to W. Malesia
Hoya lasiogynostegia P.T.Li – Hainan (Diaoluoshan)
Hoya latifolia G.Don – Myanmar to W. Malesia
Hoya laurifoliopsis Hochr. – Jawa
Hoya lauterbachii K.Schum. – New Guinea
Hoya leembruggeniana Koord. – Jawa
Hoya leucantha S.Moore – New Guinea
Hoya leucorhoda Schltr. – New Guinea
Hoya leytensis Elmer ex C.M.Burton – Philippines (Leyte)
Hoya limoniaca S.Moore – New Caledonia (Î. des Pins)
Hoya linapauliana Kloppenb. – Philippines (Luzon)
Hoya linavergarae Kloppenb. & Siar – Philippines
Hoya lindaueana Koord. – E. Jawa
Hoya linearis Wall. ex D.Don – Nepal to China (NW. Yunnan) and Indo-China
Hoya lipoensis P.T.Li & Z.R.Xu – China (Guizhou)
Hoya lithophytica Kidyoo – Thailand
Hoya lobbii Hook.f. – Assam, Thailand to Cambodia
Hoya lockii V.T.Pham & Aver. – Vietnam
Hoya loheri Kloppenb. – Philippines
Hoya longifolia Wall. ex Wight – Himalaya to China (Yunnan) and Nicobar Islands
Hoya longipedunculata V.T.Pham & Aver. – Vietnam
Hoya loyceandrewsiana T.Green – N. Thailand to Vietnam
Hoya luatekensis Kloppenb. – Samoa (NE. Savai'i)
Hoya lucardenasiana Kloppenb. – Philippines
Hoya lucyae Kloppenb. & Siar – Philippines
Hoya lutea Kostel. – Maluku
Hoya lyi H.Lév. – China (Sichuan to Guangdong) and N. Indo-China

M
Hoya macgillivrayi F.M.Bailey – N. Queensland
Hoya macrophylla Blume – Borneo, Jawa to Lesser Sunda Islands
Hoya madulidii Kloppenb. – Philippines (Mindanao)
Hoya magnifica P.I.Forst. & Liddle – Papua New Guinea
Hoya magniflora P.T.Li – Jawa
Hoya mahaweeensis Kloppenb. – Philippines
Hoya maingayi Hook.f. – Pen. Thailand to Pen. Malaysia
Hoya malata Kloppenb. – Samoa (‘Upolu)
Hoya mappigera Rodda & Simonsson – Thailand to Pen. Malaysia, Borneo (Sabah, Brunei)
Hoya marananiae Kloppenb. – Philippines
Hoya marginata Schltr. – Bismarck Arch. (New Britain)
Hoya mariae (Schltr.) L.Wanntorp & Meve – Philippines
Hoya martinii Kloppenb. & G.Mend. – Philippines
Hoya marvinii Kloppenb. – Philippines
Hoya mata-ole-afiensis Kloppenb. – Samoa
Hoya matavanuensis Kloppenb. – Samoa
Hoya matiensis Kloppenb. – Philippines
Hoya maxima Teijsm. & Binn. – Sulawesi
Hoya maximowayetii Kloppenb. – Philippines
Hoya mcclurei Kloppenb. – Hainan
Hoya mcgregorii Schltr. – Philippines (Mindoro)
Hoya medinae Kloppenb. – Philippines
Hoya medinillifolia Rodda & Simonsson – Borneo (Sabah, Sarawak)
Hoya megalantha Turrill – Fiji
Hoya megalaster Warb. ex K.Schum. & Lauterb. – New Guinea
Hoya meliflua (Blanco) Merr. – Borneo (Sabah), Philippines
Hoya memoria Kloppenb. – Philippines
Hoya mengtzeensis Y.Tsiang & P.T.Li – China (S. Yunnan, Guangxi) to Vietnam
Hoya meredithii T.Green – Borneo (Sabah, Sarawak)
Hoya merrillii Schltr. – Philippines
Hoya micrantha Hook.f. – Indo-China
Hoya microphylla Schltr. – New Guinea
Hoya microstemma Schltr. – NE. New Guinea
Hoya migueldavidii Cabactulan – Philippines
Hoya minahassae Schltr. – Sulawesi
Hoya mindanaoensis Kloppenb. – Philippines
Hoya mindorensis Schltr. – Philippines to N. & C. Borneo
Hoya minima Costantin – Vietnam
Hoya minutiflora Rodda & Simonsson – Borneo (Kalimantan)
Hoya miquilingensis Kloppenb. – Philippines (Luzon)
Hoya mirabilis Kidyoo – Thailand
Hoya mitrata Kerr – Thailand to W. & C. Malesia
Hoya monetteae T.Green – Borneo (Sabah), Philippines, Sulawesi
Hoya moninae Kloppenb. & Cajano – Philippines
Hoya montana Schltr. – New Guinea
Hoya montelbanensis Kloppenb. – Philippines
Hoya mucronulata Warb. – New Guinea
Hoya multiflora Blume – China (Guangxi, Yunnan) to Trop. Asia
Hoya myanmarica P.T.Li – Myanmar
Hoya myrmecopa Kleijn & Donkelaar – Philippines, Sulawesi

N
Hoya nabawanensis Kloppenb. & Wiberg – Borneo (Sabah)
Hoya nakarensis Kloppenb. – Philippines
Hoya narcissiflora S.Rahayu & Rodda – Borneo (Kalimantan)
Hoya naumannii Schltr. – Solomon Islands
Hoya navicula Kloppenb. & G.Mend. – Philippines
Hoya negrosensis Kloppenb. – Philippines
Hoya neocaledonica Schltr. – New Caledonia
Hoya neoebudica Guillaumin – Vanuatu
Hoya neoguineensis Engl. – New Guinea
Hoya nervosa Y.Tsiang & P.T.Li – China (S. Yunnan, Guangxi)
Hoya nova Kloppenb. – Philippines
Hoya nummularia Decne. ex Hook.f. – Assam to Indo-China
Hoya nummularioides Costantin – Indo-China
Hoya nutans Aver. & V.T.Pham – Vietnam
Hoya nuttiana Rodda & Simonsson – Borneo (Sarawak)
Hoya nuuuliensis Kloppenb. & Siar – Samoa
Hoya nyhuusiae Kloppenb. – Borneo (Sabah, Brunei)

O
Hoya obcordata Hook.f. – E. Himalaya
Hoya oblanceolata Hook.f. – Assam, Sumatera
Hoya oblongacutifolia Costantin – Thailand to S. Vietnam
Hoya obovata Decne. – Indo-China, Sulawesi, Maluku
Hoya obscura Elmer ex C.M.Burton – Borneo to Philippines
Hoya obtusifolia Wight – Indo-China to W. Malesia
Hoya odetteae Kloppenb. – Philippines (Mindanao)
Hoya odorata Schltr. – Philippines
Hoya ofuensis Kloppenb. – Samoa
Hoya oleoides Schltr. – New Guinea
Hoya oligantha Schltr. – New Guinea
Hoya olosegaensis Kloppenb. – Samoa (Savai'i)
Hoya omlorii (Livsh. & Meve) L.Wanntorp & Meve – Pen. Malaysia (Perak), Sumatera, Borneo (Sarawak)
Hoya onychoides P.I.Forst. – Papua New Guinea
Hoya oreogena Kerr – Thailand
Hoya oreostemma Schltr. – New Guinea
Hoya orientalis P.T.Li – Philippines
Hoya ormocensis Kloppenb. – Philippines (Leyte)
Hoya ottolanderi Koord. – Jawa
Hoya ovalifolia Wight & Arn. – SW. & S. India, Sri Lanka
Hoya oxycoccoides S.Moore – New Guinea

P–Q
Hoya pachyclada Kerr – Indo-China
Hoya pachyphylla K.Schum. & Lauterb. – New Guinea
Hoya pachypus S.Moore – New Guinea
Hoya palawanensis Kloppenb. – Philippines
Hoya palawanica Kloppenb. – Philippines (Palawan)
Hoya pallilimba Kleijn & Donkelaar – Sulawesi
Hoya panayensis Kloppenb. & Siar – Philippines (Panay)
Hoya pandurata Tsiang – China (S. Yunnan) to Indo-China
Hoya papaschonii Rodda – Thailand
Hoya papillantha K.Schum. – Bismarck Arch
Hoya papuana (Schltr.) Schltr. – Papua New Guinea
Hoya parvapollinia Kloppenb. & G.Mend. – Philippines
Hoya parviflora Wight – Bangladesh to Sumatera
Hoya parvifolia Schltr. – Sumatera
Hoya patameaensis Kloppenb. – Samoa (Savai'i)
Hoya patella Schltr. – New Guinea
Hoya pauciflora Wight – SW. India, Sri Lanka
Hoya paulshirleyi T.Green & Kloppenb. – Sulawesi
Hoya paziae Kloppenb. – Philippines
Hoya pedunculata (Warb.) Schltr. – NE. New Guinea
Hoya peekelii Markgr. – Bismarck Arch
Hoya pentaphlebia Merr. – Philippines
Hoya perakensis Ridl. – Pen. Malaysia
Hoya persicina Kloppenb. – Philippines
Hoya phuluangensis Kidyoo – Thailand
Hoya phuwuaensis Kidyoo – N. Thailand
Hoya phyllura O.Schwartz – Borneo
Hoya piestolepis Schltr. – New Guinea
Hoya pimenteliana Kloppenb. – Philippines (Catanduanes)
Hoya placerensis Kloppenb. – Philippines
Hoya platycaulis Simonsson & Rodda – Philippines
Hoya plicata King & Gamble – Pen. Malaysia
Hoya polilloensis Kloppenb. – Philippines
Hoya polyneura Hook.f. – E. Himalaya to China (NW. Yunnan)
Hoya pruinosa (Blume) Miq. – New Guinea
Hoya pseudobicolensis Kloppenb. – Philippines
Hoya pseudoleytensis Kloppenb. – Philippines
Hoya pubens Costantin – Vietnam
Hoya puber Blume – Sumatera to W. Jawa, Borneo (Sabah, Kalimantan)
Hoya pubicalyx Merr. – Philippines (Luzon)
Hoya pubicenta Kloppenb. – Philippines
Hoya pubicorolla Kloppenb. – Philippines
Hoya pulchella Schltr. – New Guinea
Hoya pulchra Aurigue & Cabactulan – Philippines
Hoya purpurea Blume – New Guinea
Hoya purpureofusca Hook. – W. Malesia to Lesser Sunda Islands. (Bali)
Hoya pusilla Rintz – Pen. Malaysia (Pahang)
Hoya pusilliflora S.Moore – New Guinea
Hoya pycnophylla Rech. – Samoa
Hoya querinoensis Kloppenb. & Siar – Philippines
Hoya quinquenervia Warb. – Philippines (Luzon)
Hoya quisumbingii Kloppenb. – Philippines (Itbayat Island)

R
Hoya radicalis Y.Tsiang & P.T.Li – China (Guangxi, Guangdong)
Hoya ralphdavisiana Kloppenb. – Philippines
Hoya ramosii Kloppenb. & Siar – Philippines
Hoya ranauensis T.Green & Kloppenb. – Borneo (Sabah)
Hoya reticulata Moon – Maluku
Hoya retrorsa Gavrus – Borneo (Sabah)
Hoya retusa Dalzell – W. India, E. Himalaya
Hoya revolubilis Y.Tsiang & P.T.Li – China (W. Yunnan, W. Guangxi) to Vietnam
Hoya revoluta Wight ex Hook.f. – Pen. Thailand to W. Malesia
Hoya reyesii M.N.Medina & Kloppenb. – Philippines
Hoya reynosae Kloppenb. – Philippines
Hoya rhodostele Ridl. – N. Sumatera
Hoya rhodostemma Schltr. – New Guinea
Hoya rigida Kerr – Thailand
Hoya rigidifolia S.Rahayu & Rodda – Sumatera
Hoya rima Kloppenb. – Philippines
Hoya rintzii Rodda – W. Malesia
Hoya rizaliana Kloppenb. – Philippines (Luzon)
Hoya rosarioae Kloppenb. & Siar – Philippines
Hoya rosea K.Schum. – New Guinea
Hoya rostellata Kidyoo – Thailand
Hoya rotundiflora Rodda & Simonsson – Myanmar
Hoya rubida Schltr. – Bismarck Arch
Hoya rumphii Blume – Jawa
Hoya rundumensis (T.Green) Rodda & Simonsson – Borneo (Sabah, Sarawak)
Hoya ruthiae Rodda – Borneo (Sabah)

S
Hoya sabaensis Kloppenb. – Borneo (Sabah)
Hoya sagcalii Kloppenb. – Philippines
Hoya salmonea Kloppenb. – Philippines
Hoya salweenica Y.Tsiang & P.T.Li – China (W. Yunnan)
Hoya samarensis Kloppenb. & Siar – Philippines
Hoya sammannaniana A.L.Lamb – Borneo (Sabah, Kalimantan)
Hoya samoa-albiflora Kloppenb. – Samoa (Upolu)
Hoya samoensis Seem. – Samoa
Hoya santafeensis Kloppenb. & G.Mend. – Philippines
Hoya santiagoi Kloppenb. & Siar – Philippines
Hoya sapaensis T.B.Tran & Rodda – Vietnam
Hoya sarawakensis Kloppenb. – Borneo (Sarawak)
Hoya sarcophylla Ridl. – Sumatera
Hoya savaiiensis Kloppenb. – Samoa
Hoya schallertiae C.M.Burton – Philippines
Hoya schneei Schltr. – Caroline Islands. (Pohnpei)
Hoya scortechinii King & Gamble – Thailand to W. Malesia
Hoya seanwhistleriana Kloppenb. – Samoa
Hoya serpens Hook.f. – C. & E. Himalaya, Andaman Islands
Hoya shepherdii Short ex Hook. – E. Himalaya to Assam
Hoya siamica Craib – China (NW. Yunnan) to Indo-China
Hoya sigillatis T.Green – Borneo (Sabah)
Hoya silvatica Y.Tsiang & P.T.Li – S. Tibet to China (NW. Yunnan)
Hoya sipitangensis Kloppenb. & Wiberg – N. & NW. Borneo
Hoya smithii Kloppenb. – Fiji
Hoya soidaoensis Kidyoo – Thailand
Hoya solaniflora Schltr. – New Guinea
Hoya soligamiana Kloppenb. – Philippines
Hoya solokensis S.Rahayu & Rodda – Sumatera
Hoya somadeeae Rodda & Simonsson – Thailand
Hoya sororia K.Schum. – Bismarck Arch
Hoya spartioides (Benth.) Kloppenb. – Borneo
Hoya spencii Kloppenb. – Samoa
Hoya stenakei Simonsson & Rodda – Papua New Guinea
Hoya stenophylla Schltr. – New Guinea
Hoya stoneana Kloppenb. & Siar – Philippines
Hoya subcalva Burkill – New Guinea
Hoya subglabra Schltr. – New Guinea
Hoya subquaterna Miq. – Jawa
Hoya subquintuplinervis Miq. – N. Thailand
Hoya sulitii Kloppenb. – Philippines
Hoya sumatrana S.Rahayu & Rodda – Sumatera
Hoya surigaoensis Kloppenb. – Philippines
Hoya sussuela (Roxb.) Merr. – Malesia to N. Queensland

T
Hoya tamaleaaea Kloppenb. – Samoa
Hoya tamdaoensis Rodda & T.B.Tran – China (Guangxi) to Vietnam
Hoya tangerina Kloppenb. – Philippines
Hoya tannaensis T.Green & Kloppenb. – Vanuatu
Hoya tauensis Kloppenb. – American Samoa
Hoya taylorii Kloppenb. – Philippines (Luzon)
Hoya taytayensis Kloppenb. & Siar – Philippines
Hoya taywanisensis Kloppenb. – Philippines (Luzon)
Hoya telosmoides Omlor – Borneo (Sabah, N. Sarawak)
Hoya tengchongensis J.F.Zhang – China (Yunnan)
Hoya tenggerensis Bakh.f. – E. Jawa
Hoya teretifolia Griff. ex Hook.f. – Arunachal Pradesh to Assam
Hoya thailandica Thaithong – N. Thailand
Hoya thomsonii Hook.f. – Tibet to Assam
Hoya thuathienhuensis T.B.Tran – Vietnam
Hoya tiatuilaensis Kloppenb. – American Samoa
Hoya tjadasmalangensis Bakh.f. – W. Jawa
Hoya tjampeaensis Hochr. – Jawa
Hoya tomataensis T.Green & Kloppenb. – Sulawesi
Hoya torricellensis Schltr. – New Guinea
Hoya trigonolobos Schltr. – Bismarck Arch
Hoya trukensis Hosok. – Caroline Islands
Hoya tsangii C.M.Burton – Philippines (S. Luzon)
Hoya tsiangiana P.T.Li – Sulawesi

U–V
Hoya uafatoensis Kloppenb. – Samoa (Upolu)
Hoya uncinata Teijsm. & Binn. – Sumatera to W. Jawa
Hoya undulata S.Rahayu & Rodda – Borneo (Kalimantan)
Hoya unica Kloppenb. – Philippines
Hoya uniflora Aver. & V.T.Pham – Laos
Hoya unruhiana Kloppenb. – Philippines
Hoya uplandgrantensis Kloppenb. – Philippines
Hoya upoluensis Reinecke – Samoa
Hoya urniflora (P.I.Forst.) Simonsson & Rodda – Papua New Guinea
Hoya vacciniiflora O.Schwartz – Borneo
Hoya vaccinioides Hook.f. – Arunachal Pradesh to Indo-China
Hoya vangviengiensis Rodda & Simonsson – China (S. Yunnan) to Laos
Hoya vanuatensis T.Green – Vanuatu
Hoya variifolia Ridl. – Sumatera (Kep. Mentawai)
Hoya velasioi Kloppenb. – Philippines
Hoya venusta Schltr. – New Guinea
Hoya versteegii Simonsson & Rodda – W. New Guinea
Hoya verticillata (Vahl) G.Don – Trop. & Subtrop. Asia to Samoa
Hoya vicencioana Kloppenb. – Philippines
Hoya vitellina Blume – W. Jawa, Borneo (Sarawak)
Hoya vitellinoides Bakh.f. – Sumatera to Jawa
Hoya vitiensis Turrill – Fiji

W–Z
Hoya wallichii (Wight) C.M.Burton – S. Malaya, Borneo (Brunei)
Hoya walliniana Kloppenb. & Nyhuus – Borneo (Sabah, Sarawak)
Hoya wariana Schltr. – New Guinea
Hoya wayetii Kloppenb. – Philippines (N. Luzon)
Hoya waymaniae Kloppenb. – Borneo
Hoya weebella Kloppenb. – Thailand
Hoya whistleri Kloppenb. – Samoa
Hoya wightii Hook.f. – W. & S. India
Hoya williamsiana Kloppenb. – Philippines
Hoya wongii Rodda – Borneo (Brunei)
Hoya wrayi King & Gamble – Thailand to W. Malesia
Hoya yingjiangensis J.Feng Zhang – China (Yunnan)
Hoya yuennanensis Hand.-Mazz. – China (NW. Yunnan)
Hoya yvesrocheri Simonsson & Rodda – Papua New Guinea

References

Bibliography
 

Hoya